The 2022–23 Svenska Cupen is the 67th season of the Svenska Cupen and the eleventh season with the current format. The winners of the competition will secure a spot in the second qualifying round of the 2023–24 UEFA Europa Conference League, unless they had already qualified for European competition in the 2022–23 season, in which case the qualification spot will go to fourth-placed team of the 2022 Allsvenskan. A total of 96 clubs will enter the competition, 64 teams from district sites and 32 from the Allsvenskan and the Superettan.

Round dates
The schedule of the competition is as follows.

Teams

Round 1

64 clubs from the third tier or lower of the Swedish league system competed in this round.

Matches

Round 2
64 teams compete in this round: 32 winners from Round 1 and the 32 teams from the 2022 Allsvenskan and 2022 Superettan.

Group stage
The 32 winners from round 2 were divided into eight groups of four teams. The 16 highest ranked winners from the previous rounds were seeded to the top two positions in each group and the 16 remaining winners went unseeded in the draw. The ranking of the 16 seeded teams was decided by league position in the 2022 season. All teams in the group stage played each other once, the highest-ranked teams from the previous rounds and teams from tier three or lower played two home matches.

Qualified teams

Seeded
AIK (1)
BK Häcken (1)
Degerfors IF (1)
Djurgårdens IF (1)
GIF Sundsvall (1)
Hammarby IF (1)
Helsingborgs IF (1)
IFK Göteborg (1)
IFK Norrköping (1)
IK Sirius (1)
Kalmar FF (1)
Malmö FF (1)
Mjällby AIF (1)
Varbergs BoIS (1)
Halmstads BK (2)
IF Brommapojkarna (2)

Unseeded
Dalkurd FF (2)
IK Brage (2)
Jönköpings Södra IF (2)
Landskrona BoIS (2)
Norrby IF (2)
Skövde AIK (2)
Trelleborgs FF (2)
Utsiktens BK (2)
Västerås SK (2)
Örebro SK (2)
Östersunds FK (2)
FC Trollhättan (3)
GAIS (3)
Oskarshamns AIK (3)
IFK Luleå (4)
Onsala BK (4)

Group 1

Group 2

Group 3

Group 4

Group 5

Group 6

Group 7

Group 8

Knockout stage

The draw for the quarter-finals and semi-finals will be made on March 6, 2023.

Qualified teams

Bracket

Quarter-finals

Semi-finals

Top scorers

References

Svenska Cupen seasons
Cupen
Cupen
Sweden